The Leigh Lake Trail is a  long hiking trail in Grand Teton National Park in the U.S. state of Wyoming. For its entire length it is also part of the Valley Trail. The trail starts at the Leigh Lake trailhead and follows the eastern shores of String and Leigh Lakes and extends to Trapper Lake. The Leigh Lake trailhead is off the one-way road from North Jenny Lake Junction. The trail provides access to a half dozen camping sites on Leigh, Bearpaw and Trapper Lakes.

See also
List of hiking trails in Grand Teton National Park

References

Hiking trails of Grand Teton National Park